Mona Fastvold (born 7 March 1981) is a Norwegian filmmaker and actress. She is known for directing the drama films The Sleepwalker (2014) and The World to Come (2020). She has also directed music videos for several musicians, most notably ex-husband Sondre Lerche.

Career
Fastvold co-wrote the screenplay for The Childhood of a Leader and the story for Vox Lux with Brady Corbet, who directed both films.

Fastvold had a minor role in The Other Woman.

In 2020, Fastvold directed an adaptation of Jim Shepard's short story The World to Come into a film of the same name, starring Katherine Waterston and Vanessa Kirby.

Personal life
In 2005, Fastvold married musician Sondre Lerche. They divorced in 2013.
Since 2012, Fastvold has been dating actor and director Brady Corbet, whom she met on the set of The Sleepwalker. Their daughter was born in 2014.

References

External links

Living people
1981 births
Writers from Oslo
21st-century Norwegian actresses
Norwegian film actresses
Norwegian women film directors
Norwegian film directors
Norwegian screenwriters
Norwegian expatriates in the United States
21st-century screenwriters
21st-century Norwegian writers
21st-century Norwegian women writers
Actresses from Oslo
Norwegian women screenwriters